François de Mailly (1658–1721) was a French archbishop and Cardinal.

Biography
Born at Nesle, he had ultramontane views, and was a stern opponent of Jansenism. He was a critic of Jean Meslier.
On 11 May 1698, he was consecrated bishop by Toussaint de Forbin de Janson, Bishop of Beauvais, with Gabriel de Roquette, Bishop of Autun, and François Chevalier de Saulx, Bishop of Alès, serving as co-consecrators.
He was Archbishop of Arles from 1697, then Archbishop of Reims from 1710.

Family
His father was Louis-Charles de Nesle, marquis de Nesle.

References

External links
Coat of Arms

1658 births
1721 deaths
People from Somme (department)
Archbishops of Arles
Archbishops of Reims
18th-century French cardinals
18th-century peers of France